The Big Pasture Plateau is a karstified mountain plateau in the Kamnik–Savinja Alps northeast of Kamnik, Slovenia. There are numerous herders' dwellings that comprise several settlement areas: Velika Planina 'Big Pasture', Mala Planina 'Little Pasture', Gojška Planina 'Gozd Pasture' (named for the village of Gozd), Tiha Dolina 'Quiet Valley', and others. The Big Pasture Plateau is a tourist destination both in winter as a ski resort and in summer as a place for relaxation.

History
There is evidence that man has been present on the Big Pasture Plateau since prehistoric times. In Medieval times the plateau was used for pasturing. The oldest huts, which date from the 16th century, are nearly identical to the present Preskar Hut. The hut is oval, covered from roof to ground with shingles, without windows, doors, or a chimney.

In the winter of 1931–1932 a new form of tourism began, known as bajtarstvo, which involved renting the huts in the winter when there was no pasturing. During the Second World War, German forces and the Slovene Home Guard burned all of the huts to the ground. The chapel dedicated to Our Lady of the Snows, built in 1938 by the Slovenian architect Jože Plečnik, was also burned, but it was rebuilt in 1988.

Starting points
 With cable car from the Kamnik Bistrica Valley
 From the Volovljek Pass (by car)
 3h: from Stahovica via Saint Primus' Church above Kamnik
 5h: from the Kamnik Bistrica Valley and Kopišč via Dol 
 4h: from the Kocbek Lodge at Korošica 
 4½h: from Luče via the Volovljek Pass

Ski resort
There is a small ski resort with a cable car, one two-seat chairlift, and six surface lifts. The length of tracks is 6 km. For environmental reasons, artificial snow cannot be produced.

Mountain lodges
 Črnuče Lodge at Little Pasture (1526 m)
 Domžale Lodge at Little Pasture (1534 m)
 Jarše Lodge at Little Pasture (1520 m)

Gallery

References

External links

 Routes, Description, & Photos
 Tourism page
 WebCam

Kamnik–Savinja Alps
Karst plateaus of Slovenia
Plateaus in Upper Carniola
Ski areas and resorts in Slovenia